Sigurd is a legendary hero of Germanic mythology.

Sigurd may also refer to:
 Sigurd (name)
 Sigurd (opera), an opera by Ernest Reyer
 Sigurd, Utah, a town in Sevier County, Utah, United States
 The main character from the video game Fire Emblem: Genealogy of the Holy War
 Kamen Rider Sigurd, a character from the TV series Kamen Rider Gaim

See also
 Siward (disambiguation), English equivalent to Sigurd